Rafał Strączek (born 12 February 1999) is a Polish professional footballer who plays as a goalkeeper for  club Bordeaux.

Career statistics

References

External links

1999 births
Living people
People from Jarosław
Polish footballers
Association football goalkeepers
JKS 1909 Jarosław players
UKS SMS Łódź players
Stal Mielec players
Motor Lublin players
FC Girondins de Bordeaux players
Ekstraklasa players
I liga players
III liga players
Poland youth international footballers
Polish expatriate footballers
Expatriate footballers in France
Polish expatriate sportspeople in France